The Saudi Arabian film industry produced four feature films in 2014. This article fully lists all non-pornographic films, including short films, that had a release date in that year and which were at least partly made by Saudi Arabia. It does not include films first released in previous years that had release dates in 2014.  Also included is an overview of the major events in Saudi Arabian film, including film festivals and awards ceremonies, as well as lists of those films that have been particularly well-received, both critically and financially.

Minor releases

See also

 2014 in film
 2014 in Saudi Arabia
 Cinema of Saudi Arabia
 List of Saudi Arabian submissions for the Academy Award for Best Foreign Language Film

References

External links

Saudi Arabian
Films

Saudi Arabia